Hans Joris Van Miegroet is an art historian and educator. Primarily a scholar of the art market in Europe, Van Miegroet is currently Professor of Art and Art History at Duke University.

Career
Van Miegroet graduated from the University of Ghent with a Master of Arts in Art History in 1983, and then moved to the United States to earn a Doctor of Philosophy from the University of California, Santa Barbara in 1988. His master's thesis was on the artist Konrad Witz, and he wrote a doctoral dissertation on Gerard David, supervised by Burr E. Wallen. In that year, Van Miegroet was hired as Assistant Professor of Art and Art History at Duke University, and in 1994, was promoted to Associate Professor. In 2005, he was elevated to full Professor. In the following year, Van Miegroet became chair of the art history department, a post that he held until 2014.

See also
List of Duke University people
List of University of California, Santa Barbara alumni

References

External links
Duke University profile

Year of birth missing (living people)
Living people
Belgian art historians
Ghent University alumni
University of California, Santa Barbara alumni
Duke University faculty